The Colonne di San Lorenzo or Columns of San Lorenzo is a group of ancient Roman ruins, located in front of the Basilica of San Lorenzo in central Milan, region of Lombardy, northern Italy.

History
The colonnade, consisting mainly of 16 tall Corinthian columns in a row, now fronts an open square. In the 4th century, the columns were moved here, after removal from a likely 2nd century pagan temple or public bath house structure. South of the columns, one of the medieval gates still has some Roman marble decoration in place. In the 16th century, in preparations for a celebratory entrance into Milan of the monarch King Philip II of Spain, it was proposed to raze the colonnade to widen the route; Ferrante Gonzaga declined the suggestion.

Up until 1935, the space between the church and columns was entirely occupied by old houses abutting onto the façade of the church itself. Indeed, the church complex was fully surrounded by old houses. Despite the plans to conserve this ancient urban fabric, the renovations led to the demolition of the old houses and the isolation of the monument on the front side. Following bombing during World War II, the church complex became isolated also on the rear side, where the fenced Basilicas Park now stands, allowing popular views of the Basilica.

References

 

Buildings and structures completed in the 4th century
Monuments and memorials in Milan
Tourist attractions in Milan
Ancient Roman buildings and structures in Italy